The Gisu people, or Bamasaba people of Elgon, are a Bantu tribe of the Masaba people of eastern Uganda, closely related to the Bukusu people of Kenya. Bamasaba live mainly in the Mbale District of Uganda on the slopes of Mount Elgon.

Ancestor

The Masaba, Bukusu and Luhya people believed that their ancestors were Mundu and Sera. The people of Ethiopia and the Ethiopian Highlands have no name for Kundu, except that it is a mountain peak in Oromiya.

The Bamasaba ancestor, Maswahaba migrated from the Ethiopian Mountains traveling via Lake Turkana to Sironko and settled around Bududa where he fell in love with a Maasai girl who was known as Nabarwa. The family of Nabarwa demanded that in order for Maswahaba to marry their daughter he had to undergo their rite of circumcision. He agreed to do so.

Culture

Circumcision in Africa is an old culture as practiced by the Bamasaaba in Eastern Uganda.
The culture of circumcision was adopted by the Bamasaba from their in-laws the Maasai people. The men among the Bagisu tribe undergo initiation ceremonies known as Imbalu. The initiation ceremonies among the Bamasaaba are held every two years during August.

The Bamasaaba ancestors lived on bamboo shoots also known as maleya in the Lumasaba language. These bamboo shoots are collected from bamboo trees on top of Mt. Elgon.

Origin of the name Bagisu

Maswahaba's first son with Nabarwa was Mwambu who was nicknamed Nkisu by his Maasai uncles who had stolen his fathers cows from him. Masawahaba failed to pronounce the nickname of Nkisu meaning a bull in Maasai language, given to his son his uncle and he pronounced it as Mugisu.
The name Bagisu originated from the nickname Nkisu given to Mwambu by Maswababa's Maasai Brother-in-law.

The Bamasaba speak a dialect of the Lumasaba language called Lumasaba, which is fully understandable by other dialects, and is also understood by the Bukusu. The Bamasaba share a lot of things with the Bukusu from Kenya. They share culture and according to the Bukusu the Bamasaba are their real brothers its only the border that divides them.

References

Notes

Bibliography

Further reading
 Imbalu: Initiation Ritual Among the Bamasaba of Uganda, 2000 
 Mayegu, Andrea Kauka, (1952). The Bamasaba Tribal History
 Transafrican Journal of History, 1982, Volumes 11-13 - Page 190
 Placid, John & Wotsuna Khamalwa, (2004). Identity, power, and culture: Imbalu: Initiation ritual among the ...
 Deuxième Colloque International Folklore en Afrique D'aujourd'hui, 1984

 Godfrey Mwakikagile, (1969), Safari, Volume 1, Page 28
 Kenya Historical Review, 1974, Volume 2, Page 44
 Were, Gideon S., (1967). A history of the Abaluyia of western Kenya: c. 1500-1930, Page 43
 Dipio, Dominica & Stuart Sillars, (2014). Performing Wisdom: Proverbial Lore in Modern Ugandan Society
 Nwaogwugwu, Cletus Chukwuemeka, (2011). Ancestor Christology: a Christian Evaluation of the Ancestral Cult in the Traditional Religion of the Sub-Saharan Africa
 Heald, Suzette, (1989). Controlling Anger: The Sociology of Gisu Violence, Page x
 Paul Nakitare. I Shall Walk Alone,  Page 107
 Solomon, Thomas, (2015). African Musics in Context: Institutions, Culture, Identity, Page 314
 Kyeyune, Pastor Stephen, (2012). Shaping The Society Christianity And Culture: Special Reference to ... 
 Nannyonga-Tamusuza, Sylvia A. & Thomas Solomon, (2012). Ethnomusicology in East Africa: Perspectives from Uganda and Beyond
 Kyewalyanga, Francis-Xavier Sserufusa, (1976). Traditional Religion, Custom, and Christianity in Uganda: As ...
 Else, David, (1998). Trekking in East Africa, Page 270
 Abuso, Paul Asaka, (1980). A Traditional History of the Abakuria: C.A.D. 1400-1914, Page 27
 e Uganda Journal, 1980, Page 46
 Tripp, Aili Mari. Women and Politics in Uganda, Page 127
 Fleisch, Axel& Rhiannon Stephens, (2016). Doing Conceptual History in Africa, Page 133
 Library of Congress Subject Headings, 2012, Page B-41
 May, Elizabeth, (1983). Musics of Many Cultures: An Introduction, Page 189
 Bender, John B. & David E. Wellbery, (1991). Chronotypes: The Construction of Time, Page 251
 Cohen, David William, (1994). The Combing of History, Page 218
 Souchon, Duncan & Michael Walton, (2007). Mountains of Africa, Page 125
 Small, Christopher, (2011). Musicking: The Meanings of Performing and Listening 
 The Sphere: An Illustrated Newspaper for the Home, 1906

Ethnic groups in Uganda